Viera (pronounced /vjɛrə/) is an affluent, master-planned community located in the central coastal region of Brevard County, Florida. It is part of an unincorporated section adjacent to the Melbourne, Florida area. For census purposes, it is divided between the Census Designated Places of Viera East and Viera West.  At the 2020 census, Viera East had a population of 11,687, while Viera West had a population of 16,688.

Geography
The Viera area borders  along Interstate 95 starting at exit 195 and extending south of Florida road 404. It encompasses . About half of this has been set aside for conservation.

Neighborhoods
The community consists of 76 neighborhoods in two specific areas named Viera East (38) and Viera West  (38). Included are five active adult communities/55+, Brennity at Melbourne, Bridgewater at Viera, Viera Manor and Heritage Isle, Grand Isle, along with a military retirement community, Indian River Colony Club.

Viera East 

The neighborhood communities of Viera East are Auburn Lakes, Bayhill, Crane Creek, Cross Creek, Fawn Ridge, Grand Isle, Hammock Lakes, Hammock Trace, Heron's Landing, Lakes at Viera East, Mission Bay Apartments, Osprey, Six Mile Creek, The Greens at Viera, Capron Ridge, The Heritage, The Villages of Viera East, Viera East Golf Club, and Wingate Estates.

Viera East Golf Club includes the following communities: those of Aberdeen, Addington, Ashton, Blackheath, Brightwood, Canterbury, Collingtree, Durban Park, Oaklefe, Parkstone, Stratford Place, and Woodhall.
The villages of Viera East include the following communities: those of Bennington, Somerville, and Templeton.

Viera West 

The neighborhood communities of Viera West are Adelaide, Arrivas Village, Artistry at Viera Apartments, Fairway Lakes at Duran, Heritage Isle, Highlands Viera West Apartments, Marisol at Viera Apartments, Modern Duran, Sonoma, Stadium Villas, Summer Lakes, The Brennity at Melbourne, Three Fountains at Viera Condominiums, Villages of North Solerno, Villages of South Solerno Wickham Lakes, and Wyndham at Duran.

The North and South Villages of Solerno include Capron Trace, Charolais Estates, Chelford, Colfax Landing, Cortona, Daintree, Eason Landing, Gatwick Manor, Indigo Crossing, Levanto, Ravencliffe, Sunstone, and Terramore.

Addison Village 

Addison Village, which is a part of Viera West, has the communities of Avalonia, Bridgewater at Viera, Kerrington, Stonecrest, Loren Cove, Reeling Park, The Rutherford Collection at Reeling Park, Seville, Valencia, Pangea, Strom Park, Trasona Cove East, Trasona Cove West, Sendero Cove, and Sierra Cove.

History
The land was developed by the Viera Company, a subsidiary of A. Duda and Sons, which owned the property formerly known as Cocoa Ranch. On August 4, 1989, they broke ground in this unincorporated area for the new community of Viera. It is derived from viera meaning 'faith' in Slovak, in honor of family patriarch Andrew Duda, who immigrated to the United States in 1912 from what became Slovakia. Starting in 1990, the Duda family started developing a new community with a mix of land uses, including a variety of housing types, offices, medical and industrial parks, shopping centers and recreational facilities. Todd Pokrywa was appointed President of The Viera Company effective September 1, 2018. 

In 1992 construction began on what would become Viera East. In 1995, a  expansion was approved by Brevard County as a Substantial Deviation to the original DRI. Application was made for Substantial Deviation #2 in 2006 and was approved to plan for the final expansion of the community. The  expansion will include  to be set aside as managed protected land, conservation areas, parks and open space.

The Viera Wilderness Park ( to be set aside during the expansion) will join with the  River Lakes Conservation Area, which includes  of Cocoa Ranch purchased by the St. Johns River Water Management District in 1999. Additional acres will be set aside within development areas to serve as conservation, parks and open space bringing the total actively managed protected land in the expansion area to over 50 percent of the total area.

Economy
Viera has more than 350 businesses, including financial services, health care, and retail.

Retail
The Avenue Viera, an open-air shopping center, opened in 2004. It contains over 100 shops/restaurants with 600,000 square feet of retail/restaurant space and a multiplex movie theater. There are several nationally known restaurant chains and department stores.

Industry
Viera has several organizations, government offices and non-profits, such as the Brevard Zoo, Brevard Public Schools, the Brevard County Clerk of Courts, and Viera Hospital.

The first Park-N-Ride lot, in unincorporated Brevard County, is located there.

Government offices
The government branches and offices include the Brevard County Board of County Commissioners, County Manager, Planning and Development, Housing and Human Services, Public Works, Public Safety, Health Services and Clinic at Viera, Children's Medical Services, Utility Services, and the Metropolitan Planning Organization. The Harry T. and Harriette V. Moore Justice Center and the Brevard County School Board offices are also located within the administrative complex.

Community events
The developer of the property, The Viera Company, hosts a variety of events each year for both the community and for the Central Brevard area through the Viera Community Institute. Several main events include the Light Up Viera Holiday Parade, the July 4th Great American Celebration, and the Viera Nature Festival.

National charities such as the American Heart Association's Heart Walk, Making Strides Against Breast Cancer, the March of Dimes Walk for Babies, the Devereux Foundation, St. Baldrick's Foundation and the Scarecrow Stroll & Harvest Festival have achieved success in the community.

Government

Federal representation
The Viera area is within Florida's 8th congressional district represented by Bill Posey.

State representation
Within the boundaries of Viera, the State House (District 32) is represented by Thad Altman; the State Senate (District 17) is represented by Debbie Mayfield.

County 
The Viera community is located within an unincorporated portion of Brevard County, District 4. The County Commissioner for this district is Rob Feltner. The Brevard County School Board representative is Matt Susin (also District 4).

Community Development Districts and Master Community
Viera East Community Association (VECA) is a not-for-profit corporation formed in accordance with the Viera East Community Declaration and is the Master Association for Viera East. It is administered by a five-member Board of Directors and is responsible for the maintenance and upkeep of the hardscaping, landscaping and irrigation systems on most major roadways throughout Viera East, and in certain parks and recreational facilities. VECA is also responsible for overseeing the Modifications Review Committee (MRC).

The Viera East Community Development District is a local, special-purpose government entity authorized by Chapter 190 of the Florida Statutes as amended, and created by ordinance of Brevard County as an alternative method of planning, acquiring, operating and maintaining community-wide improvements in planned communities.

Sports

Golf
Duran Golf Club, an 18-hole golf course, opened in 2005. It is located in Central Viera. It encompasses  in the neighborhoods of Fairway Lakes at Viera, Modern Duran and Wyndham at Duran. The  British West Indies-style clubhouse contains a restaurant. The Duran Development Center includes a  complex with a practice range, target greens, pitching greens, a putting green, Footgolf and 9 hole par 3 course playable at night.

Viera East Golf Club opened in 1993 and is located in Viera East. It winds through the neighborhoods of Parkstone, Oakefe, Canterbury, Brightwood, Addington, Durban Park, Blackheath, Aberdeen, Woodhall, Collingtree, Stratford Place and Ashton.

Baseball

The USSSA (United States Specialty Sports Association) relocated to the Space Coast Stadium in 2017.  The USSSA primarily focus on amateur sports involving youth baseball, and youth and adult softball.

In 2018, Viera was the host location of that year's installment of the Women's Baseball World Cup.

Parks 
Viera Regional Park
Constructed on  donated by the Viera Company, Viera Regional Park has a community center (18,000 square feet), a fully equipped playground, three tot lots,  of lakes, a walkway system, two lighted Little League baseball fields, two lighted "major league" baseball fields, eight soccer pitches (2 lighted), lighted tennis and basketball courts, and two youth softball courts.

The Suntree-Viera Lightning Mighty Mites, an under-10 football team, won the Offense-Defense National Championship in 2009.

In 2010, two soccer clubs with a total of 1,200 members vied for space on recreational ground.

The Suntree-Viera Lightning Bantams, an under-13 Football Competition team, won the OD National Championship in January 2011.  In 2016, he SVYFL Hawks (14 and under) won the National Youth Football Championships.

Community parks
Viera has 13 community parks, three dog parks and a number of pocket parks within each neighborhood. In Viera East, Clubhouse Park, Suseda Park and Woodside Park have children's play equipment along with adjoining trail systems.  In Viera West, Eastwind Park, Westwind Park, North Solerno Park, Palmentto Park, Woodmill Park, Viera Town Center Park, Sandhill Park, and La Roca Park contain various styles of modern play equipment. La Roca Park contains the only outdoor skating rink in the community.

Recreation and tourism

The Brevard Zoo and the  Ritch Grissom Memorial Wetlands of Viera are located at the south end of the community.

Education
Viera possesses four elementary schools, a charter school, two academies, and a high school. Plans for a Viera middle school have been included with the DRI plans for the community but the three feeder chain middle schools are in other areas of Brevard. Each of Viera's schools has received "A" grades since Florida's grading process started, and each has received other state and national honors as well.

Ralph M. Williams, Jr. Elementary School
Manatee Elementary School
Quest Elementary School
Viera Elementary School
Viera Charter School K-8
 Pinecrest Academy Space Coast
 Amazing Explorers Academy Viera
Delaura Middle School, John F. Kennedy Middle School, and Ronald McNair Magnet Middle School are the feeder chain middle schools
Viera High School

Public safety
The local Brevard County Fire Rescue station 47 is the county's Specialized Response Truck dealing with HAZMAT incidents county wide. In 2011, the county opened Station #48.  This station is the county's only special operations/hazardous materials responding and training station. #48 is also home to a 9-11 memorial which includes a piece of steel from the fallen World Trade Center towers.

Infrastructure

Sewage

The county's South Central Wastewater Facility is located here.

Irrigation
Since irrigation is commonplace, residents in Viera are able to irrigate properties via reclaimed water or standard city water (depending on location.)

See also
Viera East, Florida
Viera West, Florida

References

External links
Viera magazine
Viera local newspaper

Unincorporated communities in Brevard County, Florida
Populated places established in 1990
Unincorporated communities in Florida
Planned communities in Florida